Ecoscaping is a spatial planning discipline that integrates landscape architecture and environmental science to create sustainable designs or construction.

The approach of Ecoscaping is holistic and strives to respect the pre-existing materials, microenvironments, and structures (backyards, cities, campuses, etc.) in sustainable land use management with ecological balance.

Process 
Ecoscaping searches for solutions to improve the look of a property while making minimal impact on the surrounding environment, protecting biodiversity and wildlife habitats, achieving nature conservation and ecological balance.

Examples of Ecoscaping techniques include:
 Using natural products instead of artificial decoration
 Planting trees and minimizing the use of pesticides and artificial fertilizers
 Creating out-buildings, decks, trellises, etc. that work in with the land.
 Rainwater harvesting
 Creating a self-contained water reservoir for water balance.

Significance 
Ecoscaping is a process of building and rebuilding based on nature, sustainable development, and human aesthetics. Ecoscaping provides an alternative to harsh land use practices with ecologically adverse effects, such as impervious surfaces, soil compaction, contamination, and urban sprawl.

See also

 Agroforestry
 Desert greening
 Ecological engineering
 Fertilizer tree
 Riparian buffer

References 

Sustainable architecture